The 1920 Czechoslovak presidential election took place on 27 May 1920. It was the first contested presidential election. Tomáš Garrigue Masaryk has won his second term against German theologian August Naegle.

Procedure
President was elected by bicameral parliament that consisted of 281  Deputies and 142 Senators. Candidate needed at least 247 votes to be elected.

Candidates
Tomáš Garrigue Masaryk, the incumbent president and a candidate of governing coalition.
August Naegle, candidate of German minority.
Alois Muna, candidate of left fraction of social democrats (later Communist).
Antonín Janoušek, Communist radical, former leader of Slovak Soviet Republic.

Election
Masaryk received 284 votes and was elected for his second term.

References

Presidential
1920